Daniel William Wood (born May 14, 1969) is an American singer, songwriter, record producer, and occasional actor. He is a member of the American boy band New Kids on the Block and also served as a choreographer for the band in late 80s and 90s.

Career
Wood is a member of the band New Kids on the Block (NKOTB). He joined the band at the age of 16 after being recruited by friend and bandmate Donnie Wahlberg. NKOTB was the brainchild of producer Maurice Starr who wrote and produced a number of the band's hits including their self-titled debut studio album, released in 1986, as well as "Hangin' Tough" (1988) and "Step by Step" (1990).

Personal life
Wood was married to Patricia Alfaro from 1997 to 2006. He is the father of three children, son Daniel Jr., and daughters Chance and Vega.

Charity work
"Remember Betty" is a charity that Wood set up in 2008 in memory of his mother who died, aged 55, of breast cancer in 1999. The mission of the charity is "to help minimize the financial burden associated with breast cancer for patients & survivors by providing direct financial support to them so that they can focus on recovery & quality of life."

In 2014, Wood ran the Boston Marathon to raise funds for "Remember Betty." The New Kids on the Block member finished the race in a time of 3:50:00. Fellow bandmate Joey McIntyre ran the Marathon with Wood in support of the Alzheimers Association.

Discography

Albums
D-Fuse: Room Full of Smoke (1999)
D-Wood: Room Full of Smoke, Vol. 2 (2003)
Second Face (2003)
O.F.D: Originally from Dorchester (acoustic tour exclusive) (2003)
Coming Home (2008)
Stronger: Remember Betty (2009)
Look at Me (2016)

Singles
"What If" (2003)
"When the Lights Go Out" (2003)
"Different Worlds" (2003)
"Look at Me" (2015)
"Endlessly (Betty's Wish)" (2015)

References

External links
Official website
Remember Betty website

 nkotb website

1969 births
21st-century American singers
20th-century American singers
American male singers
Living people
New Kids on the Block members
Musicians from Boston
People from Dorchester, Massachusetts
Upper Street (group) members
NKOTBSB members